Taizhou University (TU) is a comprehensive public university based in Taizhou city, Zhejiang province, China.

History 
Taizhou University was established in Linhai, Taizhou prefecture, Zhejiang province in 1907 and has undergone several organization restructures.

Campus locations 
TZU has three campuses. The main campus is in Linhai and has a floor space of 230,000 square meters. A secondary, smaller campus is also in Linhai, next to the famous Linhai Old Street and across from the Great Wall. The third campus is in the Jiaojiang District, another region of Taizhou County, and covers an area of more than 800,000 square meters.

Administration

Schools and departments 
There are 12 departments or colleges at the university.
School of Humanities and social sciences
School of Economy and Trade Management
School of Foreign Languages
School of Information and Electronics Engineering
School of Bioscience and Medical Chemistry
School of Physical Education
School of Medical
School of Adult Education
School of Mathematics
School of Machine and electronics 
School of Architecture

References

External links
Taizhou University Official website 

Universities and colleges in Zhejiang
Educational institutions established in 1907
1907 establishments in China